The following is an incomplete list of current and defunct print (or online) magazines published in Greece. They may be published in Greek language or in other languages.

A
 ΑΕΛΛΩ (published by Yacht Club of Greece)
 Avaton
 Athens Voice
  (Archeology)
  
  (Airplane History; defunct)
  
  
  
  
  
  
  (Anti; defunct)
  (Anexigito; defunct)

B
 Βαβέλ (Vavel; defunct)
 Biscotto
 Billboard Greece
 Big (defunct)

C
 Crash (defunct)
 Cook Book (defunct; published by Ethnos newspaper)
 Close Up (defunct; published by Αγγελιοφόρος newspaper)
 Cosmopolitan (defunct)
 Cockpit 
 Cogito

D
 Dapper Dan
 Defence Net
  (Difono; defunct)
  (Diotima)
 Disabled.GR
  
 Down Town

E
  
  (Elliniki Agogi)
 Esquire (defunct)
 Economistas
  (Elliniko Panorama; defunct)
  
  
  (defunct; published by Makedonia newspaper) 
  (Epta Imeres; published by Kathimerini newspaper) 
  (Efoplistis)

F
 Focus (defunct)

G
  (published by Kathimerini)
   (Glykes Alximies)
 Golden Dawn
   (Gynaika Magazine)
  (published by Eleftherotypia)

H
  (Sound and Picture; defunct)

I
  (Illustrated History; defunct)
  (History Subjects; defunct)
  (published by Eleftherotypia)
  (I lexi)
  (Ιxor; defunct)

K
 Κ (published by Kathimerini newspaper)
 Klik

L
  (defunct)
 Lifo

M
 Mancode
  Madame Figaro 
  (Mastoremata)
 Mauve - life in art (defunct)
 Max
 Maxim (defunct)
  
 Men (defunct) 
 Men's Health (defunct)
 Modelling (defunct; Scale model magazine)
  (Montelistis; defunct; Scale model magazine)
 01 (zero one; defunct)
  (Mistiki Ellada; defunct)
 Miky Maous

N
 National Geographic
  (New Sciensist; defunct)
 Νέμεciς (defunct)
 Nitro
 Nomas Magazine

O
  (Oikonomikos Taxidromos)
 One Man
 Olive
 Out (defunct; by )
  (Odos Panos; defunct)

P
 Parallaxi
 Playboy
 PCMag
 
  
  (defunct)
  (Photographos)
  (Planodion)
 
  (Porfiras)
  
  (Ptisi & Diastima)

R
 Ραδιοτηλεόραση (Radiotileorasi)
 Pop & Rock magazine

S
  (Cinema; defunct)
 Strange (defunct)
 Status (defunct)
  
  
  (Army History; defunct)

T
 
 4Τροχοί (4 troxoi)
  (Trito Mati; defunct)
 Τρόφιμα & Ποτά (Food & Beverange; published by Triaina Publishing SA)

V
 ΒΗΜΑgazino (published by To Vima)
 Vogue Greece''

See also
 List of newspapers in Greece

References

Greece
Magazines